The FIAPF (Fédération Internationale des Associations de Producteurs de Films), created in 1933, is an organization composed with 36 member associations from 30 of the leading audiovisual production countries. Its Secretariat is located in Brussels, Belgium. FIAPF is also in charge of regulating international film festivals, including some of the world's most important ones.

Functions 
FIAPF helps producers formulate policies and coordinate political action in these key areas:

 Copyright and related intellectual property rights' legislation
 Enforcement of IPR legislation and anti-piracy action
 Deployment of digital technologies and their impact on the audiovisual value chain
 Technology standardization process
 Media regulation
 Private and public sector film financing mechanisms
 Trade-related issues

Members
FIAPF members are 34 producer organizations from 27 countries:

Former members include:

Accredited film festivals
As of 2015, the FIAPF provided accreditation to 47 film festivals worldwide. The FIAPF categorizes the film festivals as Competitive, Competitive Specialised, Non-Competitive and Documentary/Short Film.

Competitive film festivals
The following film festivals have been given competitive status by the FIAPF.

Competitive specialised film festivals 
The following film festivals have been given specialised competitive status by the FIAPF.

Non-competitive film festivals 
The following film festivals have been given non-competitive status by the FIAPF.

Documentary and short film festivals 
The following film festivals are for documentary and short films.

Former accredited film festivals 
The following film festivals used to be accredited by the FIAPF, but withdrew.

References

External links
 FIAPF Official Website
 FIAPF-Accredited Film Festivals: 
 2019 (Competitive, Specialized, Non-Competitive, Documentary & Short)
 2016, 2010-2011, 2008.

Film organisations in Belgium